Tałty  is a village in the administrative district of Gmina Mikołajki, within Mrągowo County, Warmian-Masurian Voivodeship, in northern Poland.

The village has a population of 320.

References

Villages in Mrągowo County